Exelastis vuattouxi is a moth of the family Pterophoridae. It is found in Côte d'Ivoire and Nigeria.

References

Exelastini
Insects of West Africa
Moths of Africa
Moths described in 1970